The Great Depression is an album by the folk punk band Defiance, Ohio. Despite being produced and distributed for profit by No Idea Records, the album is available under a creative commons license (CC BY-NC-SA). The cigarette smoking man on the cover is Steven Stothard.

Track listing

Personnel
Music
 BZ - drums, violin
 Geoff Hing - guitar, vocals
 Ryan Woods - bass, vocals
 Sherri Miller - banjo, cello, guitar, vocals
 Theo Hilton - drums, guitar, vocals
 Will Staler - drums, guitar, harmonica, vocals

Production
 Jacob Belser - engineer, production, mastering, mixing

References

Albums free for download by copyright owner
Defiance, Ohio (band) albums
2006 albums